Otradny is a town in Samara Oblast, Russia, located on the left bank of the Bolshoy Kinel River (Samara's tributary),  east of Samara. Population:

History
The settlement of Otradnoye was founded in the beginning of the 1920s by the peasants of the village of Chernovka. In 1946, an oil-extracting settlement of Mukhanovo was established nearby, and in 1947 it was granted urban-type settlement status and renamed Otradny. It grew and absorbed the settlement of Otradnoye, and in 1956 it was granted town status.

Administrative and municipal status
Within the framework of administrative divisions, it is incorporated as the town of oblast significance of Otradny—an administrative unit with the status equal to that of the districts. As a municipal division, the town of oblast significance of Otradny is incorporated as Otradny Urban Okrug.

Sister city
 Bačka Palanka, Serbia

References

Notes

Sources

External links
Pictures of Otradny

Cities and towns in Samara Oblast
Cities and towns built in the Soviet Union
Populated places established in the 1920s